Thilmany Papers was a manufacturer of specialty lightweight packaging, pressure-sensitive, and technical and industrial papers. Thilmany Papers paper mill operations were located in Kaukauna and De Pere, Wisconsin. Thilmany Papers is now a part of Ahlstrom Munksjö, which also owns paper mills in Rhinelander, Wisconsin, De Pere, Wisconsin, and Mosinee, Wisconsin.

Oscar Thilmany (the company's namesake) opened the Kaukauna mill in 1883. The company's current plant is the source of the aroma most associated with Kaukauna.

References

External links
Official website for Expera Specialty Solutions

Pulp and paper companies of the United States
Defunct pulp and paper companies
Companies based in Wisconsin